Elijah Montalto (1567 – 1616) was a Marrano physician and polemicist from Paris, who became the personal physician of Maria de Medici.

He had been reared as a Christian in Portugal and openly returned to Judaism on settling in Venice. His Suitable and Incontrovertible Propositions was an anti-Christian polemic. He was one of the teachers of Joseph Solomon Delmedigo.

When Montalto died, Saul Levi Morteira went to Paris to recover his body for burial in Beth Haim of Ouderkerk aan de Amstel, one of the Jewish cemeteries in Amsterdam.

Works

References

External links

1567 births
1616 deaths
17th-century Sephardi Jews
Physicians from Paris
16th-century Italian physicians
Jewish apologists
Portuguese Jews
Critics of Christianity